The 1984 Prize of Moscow News was the 19th edition of an international figure skating competition organized in Moscow, Soviet Union. It was held December 5–9, 1984. Medals were awarded in the disciplines of men's singles, ladies' singles, pair skating and ice dancing. The men's category was won by European champion Alexandre Fadeev, who would end his season with the world title. The ladies' gold medal went to Olympic medalist Kira Ivanova, winning her fourth Prize of Moscow News title. Olympic medalists Larisa Selezneva / Oleg Makarov took the pairs' title, earning their second win at the Prize of Moscow News. In the ice dancing category, Olympic bronze medalists Marina Klimova / Sergei Ponomarenko defeated the Olympic silver medalists Natalia Bestemianova / Andrei Bukin.

Men

Ladies

Pairs

Ice dancing

References

Prize of Moscow
Prize of Moscow News
Prize of Moscow